Merced County High School, also known as the County Library Building, is a historic building located at 2125 M St. in Merced, California, United States. Built in 1897, the school was the first public high school in Merced County. The brick and wood building was designed in the Richardsonian Romanesque style and featured a hip roof with cross gables, a rounded entry, windows arranged in a ribbon patter, and a since-removed wooden tower. The school's brick exterior was later plastered over and its roof painted red, giving the building a Mission Revival appearance. The building served as a high school until 1920; in the following year, the county library moved into the building, where it remained until 1976.

Merced County High School was added to the National Register of Historic Places on May 31, 1984.

References

External links

School buildings on the National Register of Historic Places in California
Libraries on the National Register of Historic Places in California
Romanesque Revival architecture in California
School buildings completed in 1897
Buildings and structures in Merced, California
Education in Merced County, California
Educational institutions disestablished in 1920
National Register of Historic Places in Merced County, California